Réginald Becque (born 13 September 1972) is a French former professional football player and manager. As of April 2020, he works for the French Football Federation.

Playing career 
In 2000, Becque captained fourth-division side Calais RUFC to the Coupe de France Final, which they eventually lost by a score of 2–1 against Nantes. At the end of the match, Mickaël Landreau, who was the captain of Nantes, let Becque lift the Coupe de France trophy with him.

After football 
Becque retired from football in 2005, at the age of 32. He went on to be a coach for Calais B, AS Audruicq, and AS Marck.

As of April 2020, Becque works in the FFF amateur departments.

Honours 
Valenciennes
 Championnat de France Amateur: 

Calais
 Coupe de France runner-up: 1999–2000

References 

1972 births
Living people
French footballers
French football managers
People from Denain
Association football defenders
French Division 3 (1971–1993) players
French Division 4 (1978–1993) players
Championnat National 2 players
Championnat National players
Championnat National 3 players
Le Havre AC players
Chamois Niortais F.C. players
RCP Fontainebleau players
Valenciennes FC players
Calais RUFC players
Footballers from Hauts-de-France